Attilio Barcella (born 6 June 1966) is a former Italian alpine skier.

Biography
The best results of his career were the victory of discipline cup (giant slalom) in the FIS Alpine Ski Europa Cup in 1989 and was also 3rd in overall, a national title (giant slalom) at the Italian Alpine Ski Championships in 1989 and a top ten result (5th place) in FIS Alpine Ski World Cup always in giant slalom and always in 1989 season.

World Cup results
Top 10

Europa Cup results
Barcella has won an Europa Cup discipline cup.

FIS Alpine Ski Europa Cup
Giant slalom: 1989

National titles
Barcella has won an national championship at individual senior level.

Italian Alpine Ski Championships
Giant slalom: 1989

References

External links
 

1966 births
Living people
Italian male alpine skiers